Phonodus is an extinct genus of procolophonid parareptile. It is known from a single skull found from the Early Triassic Katberg Formation in South Africa. It is the oldest known member of the subfamily Leptopleuroninae, and was likely the result of a procolophonid migration into the Karoo Basin from Laurasia after the Permo-Triassic extinction event. Because Phonodus had large maxillary teeth underneath a large antorbital buttress (a bony prominence in front of the eye), and a lack of ventral temporal emargination along the side of the skull, it probably had a durophagous diet.

References

Leptopleuronines
Early Triassic reptiles of Africa
Triassic parareptiles
Fossil taxa described in 2010
Prehistoric reptile genera